Hermann Adam Widemann (December 24, 1822 – February 7, 1899) was a businessman from Germany who was a judge and member of the cabinet of the Kingdom of Hawaii.

Life
Widemann was born in Hanover, Germany on December 24, 1822.
As a teenager he went to work on a whaling ship. He came to live in the Hawaiian Islands in 1846, after stopping in 1843.
He came briefly to the California Gold Rush in 1849, but returned after his companion John von Pfister was murdered.
He married a native Hawaiian Kaumana "Mary" Kapoli in 1854 and lived in Līhue.
He became sheriff of the island of Kauai in 1854, was elected to the house of representatives in the legislature of the Hawaiian Kingdom in 1855, and in 1863 appointed its circuit judge.
He started one of the first sugarcane plantations in Hawaii known as  Grove Farm.
During the American Civil War he supported the Confederate States.

After selling Grove Farm to its manager George Norton Wilcox in 1865, he moved to Honolulu to work in the capital. On July 10, 1869 he was appointed to the kingdom's supreme court, despite never having any formal law school training.
On February 18, 1874 he was appointed to the cabinet as minister of the interior until May 28, 1874, as well as on the Privy Council, the board of education, commissioner of crown lands, president of the bureau of immigration, and board of health.
In 1878 he started the Waianae Sugar Company in the Waianae district of Oahu island.

On February 25, 1891 he was appointed as Minister of Finance to Queen Liliuokalani, but had to resign two weeks later on March 10. He was temporarily replaced by Samuel Parker, and then John Mott-Smith. After Mott-Smith was sent to Washington, DC to attempt to negotiate a trade treaty, Parker served again briefly until Widemann resumed his duties as minister of finance.
He also filled in briefly as Attorney General from July 27, 1892 to August 29, 1892.

After the 1893 overthrow of the Kingdom of Hawaii, Widemann was sent with Parker and John Adams Cummins to Washington, DC,  in an attempt to get international support for its restoration. He then continued to London and Berlin but was never successful.

Widemann was interviewed by US Commissioner James H. Blount in preparing his Blount Report on May 20, 1893.
He was the first to experiment with the Guatemalan variety of coffea tree, which turned out to be well-adapted to higher elevations; it became the most popular variety through modern times.

He died February 7, 1899.
After a funeral in the Cathedral of Our Lady of Peace, he was buried in Oahu Cemetery.
He was survived by two sons and seven daughters.

His daughter Wilhelmina Widemann organized the first women's suffrage club in the Territory of Hawaii in 1912. His son Carl Widemann married Helen Umiokalani Parker, daughter of Samuel Parker in July 1899.

See also

 Coffee production in Hawaii

References

1822 births
1899 deaths
Hawaiian Kingdom politicians
Members of the Hawaiian Kingdom House of Representatives
Hawaiian Kingdom Interior Ministers
Members of the Hawaiian Kingdom Privy Council
Members of the Hawaiian Kingdom House of Nobles
Hawaiian Kingdom Finance Ministers
Hawaiian Kingdom Attorneys General
Businesspeople from Hawaii
German emigrants to the Hawaiian Kingdom
Justices of the Hawaii Supreme Court
People associated with the overthrow of the Hawaiian Kingdom
Members of the Hawaii Board of Education
Members of the Hawaii Board of Health
19th-century American businesspeople